Point au Gaul is a town in the Canadian province of Newfoundland and Labrador, Canada. The town had a population of 67 in the Canada 2021 Census, down from 88 in 2016. Point au Gaul is approximately 76 km southeast of Marystown.

Demographics 

See also
 Burin Peninsula
 List of cities and towns in Newfoundland and Labrador

References

Towns in Newfoundland and Labrador